The Ruckenkreuz (Rucken Cross) is an 8.4 metre tall, 2.80 metre wide memorial cross of reinforced concrete. It stands on a rocky mountain at Blaubeuren, Baden-Württemberg, Germany,  in memory of the inhabitants of Blaubeuren killed in World War I. The Ruckenkreuz was completed on November 21, 1926.

Geographical coordinates: 

Monuments and memorials in Germany
Military monuments and memorials
Buildings and structures in Alb-Donau-Kreis

de:Blaubeuren#Kultur und Sehenswürdigkeiten